Thaumaglossa americana is a species of carpet beetle in the family Dermestidae. It is found in North America.

References

Further reading

 
 

Dermestidae
Articles created by Qbugbot
Beetles described in 1882